Skierniewice  is a city in central Poland with 47,031 inhabitants (2021), situated in the Łódź Voivodeship (since 1999), previously capital of Skierniewice Voivodeship (1975–1998). It is the capital of Skierniewice County. The town is situated almost exactly halfway between Łódź and Warsaw. Through the town runs the small river Łupia, also called Skierniewka.

History
The oldest known mention of Skierniewice comes from 1359, although it existed earlier. A palace of the archbishops of Gniezno already existed in the village at that time. Skierniewice gained municipal rights in 1457 and was vested with various privileges in 1456–1458. Administratively it was part of the Rawa Voivodeship of the Greater Poland Province of the Polish Crown until the Partitions of Poland. Skierniewice was located on a trade route connecting major Polish cities Toruń and Lwów. Local merchants also participated in trade with Gdańsk, Lesser Poland and Podolia, as well as German states. One yearly fair took place since 1457, in 1527 King Sigismund I the Old established a second fair, and in 1641 the Sejm established two more fairs. The town suffered in the 18th-century as a result of the Swedish invasion of Poland and epidemics, and in 1793 it was annexed by Prussia in the Second Partition of Poland.

Regained by Poles as part of the short-lived Duchy of Warsaw in 1806, in 1815 it became part of so-called Congress Poland and fell to the Russian Partition. In 1845 the Warsaw-Vienna Railway was opened, which passed through Skierniewice. Subjected to Anti-Polish and Russification policies, many inhabitants took part in the unsuccessful Polish January Uprising in 1863 and in 1905–1906 Polish protests took place in the town. On September 15, 1884 it was the setting for the meeting of the Three Emperors' League.
From the beginning of the 1890s there was considerable business development in the city. Two brickworks emerged, a brewery, a mechanical sawmill, a tile factory, a large mill, etc. In addition, a modern hospital and a few schools were built. The railway, as well as the military (Russian) garrison posted here, were of great importance. The Russian tsar also had a mansion in Skierniewice.

During World War I it was occupied by Germany, and after the war, in 1918, it became part of the re-established Polish state. The population increased and economic development started again. A building for the district council was erected. The railway station was rebuilt after the devastation of the war and the district hospital was expanded.

During the invasion of Poland, which marked the beginning of World War II, in September 1939, the Germans raided the town, bombing the railway station, as well as houses, the hospital and a church during a church service. Around 150 people were killed, and another 200 were wounded, 100 buildings were destroyed. Captured by the Wehrmacht on September 10, 1939, the next day German troops carried out an execution of 60 Poles in the town. On September 11–12, Adolf Hitler visited the town. During the occupation, the Germans established a transit camp for Polish prisoners of war, later deported to Nazi Germany, and a ghetto for Jews, later deported to the Warsaw Ghetto and Nazi concentration camps. The Germans executed over 200 people in the town, however, the Polish underground resistance movement still operated there. The production of the existing factories was converted to manufacture products for Germany and adapted to the needs of the Germans. On January 17, 1945, Skierniewice was captured by Soviet forces.

Between 1945 and 1997 the area of the city increased to double and the population increased from 17,524 in 1946 to 47,188 in 1992. Many new factories and thus jobs emerged. In 1975, Skierniewice county was formed, which led to the establishment of a number of institutions. In 1990, the first free elections to the City Council were held. During the 1999 administrative reform, Skierniewice gained the status of a city with district rights under Łódź county.

The city’s economy is based on the textile industry (dating from the 17th century as a dressmakers’ centre) and the manufacture of farm machinery and electronic products. With an agricultural research institute, it is also known for fruit farming.

Sights
Among the historic sights of Skierniewice are:
 former Episcopal Palace complex with the Park Miejski ("Municipal Park")
 Skierniewice railway station
 churches of Saint James and Saint Stanislaus
 Market Square (Rynek) with the Town Hall (Ratusz)
 Roundhouse Skierniewice
 other historic buildings and structures, including the Kozłowski Villa, now housing the Wedding Palace, and the County Office

Education 

 Wyższa Szkoła Ekonomiczno-Humanistyczna
 State Higher Vocational School in Skierniewice

Sports
 and  football clubs are based in Skierniewice.

International relations

Twin towns – Sister cities
Skierniewice is twinned with:

Notable people

Notable people connected with the Skierniewice region:
 Ignacy Krasicki (1735–1801), Roman Catholic archbishop and a writer
 Jan Kozietulski (1781–1821), military commander of the armed forces of the Duchy of Warsaw
 Frédéric Chopin (1810–1849), composer and pianist
 Władysław Reymont (1867–1925), novelist, Nobel Prize Winner for Literature 
 Edward Okuń (1872–1945), Polish Art Nouveau painter and freemason
 Stanisław Witkowski (1883–1957), officer, engineer and military industry organiser in the Polish Army
 Aleksander Narbut-Łuczyński (1890–1977), Polish lawyer and military officer
 Princess Elisabeth of Hesse and by Rhine (1895–1903), German princess
 Szczepan Pieniążek (1913–2008), pomologist
 Itshak Holtz (1925–2018), Jewish genre artist
 Aleksandra Śląska (1925–1989), film actress
 Lech Mackiewicz (born 1960) film director, actor and playwright
 Tamara Arciuch (born 1975), actress
 Monika Mularczyk (born 1980), football referee
 Grzegorz Gajewski (born 1985), chess grandmaster

References

External links

 

 
Cities and towns in Łódź Voivodeship
City counties of Poland
Rawa Voivodeship
Warsaw Governorate
Warsaw Voivodeship (1919–1939)
Łódź Voivodeship (1919–1939)